Wannabe is a 2005 comedy film starring Craig Robert Young, Adam Huss, Anna Becker, and Elizabeth Warner. It was written and produced by Young and Richard Keith and directed by Keith.

Plot 
Steve Williams (Craig Robert Young) was once part of boy band "Busboyz", but after surviving a horrific accident which killed the other members of the band, he now finds himself struggling for work, seeking credibility as an actor and the focus of a documentary.  After being dropped by his manager for Paul—who was in a boy band rivalling "Busboyz"—Steve tries to make his own way through ever more demeaning auditions until he hears of a casting call for a Monkees-like TV show where he could showcase his acting, dancing and singing talents.

However, Steve then learns that Paul has been passing off as his own a dance contest victory which Paul won, and his nemesis is also trying out for the show.  With a dance face-off between them on the cards, who will win out?

Production
The film is directed by Richard Keith and was co-written by Keith and Young. It is based loosely on Young's own experiences as an actor in L.A. and former pop band member in UK Brit pop band, Deuce.

It stars Craig Young, Adam Huss, Anna Becker, and Liz Warner, with Brian Nahas, Carole Ita White, Eddie Mills, Tate Taylor, and Susan Duerden, and also features a cameo by Kyle XYs Matt Dallas.

Reception
The film won the Audience Award Best Feature at Dances With Films 2006.

References

External links 
  – via Internet Archive
 

2005 films
2005 comedy films
Films shot in California
American comedy films
2000s English-language films
2000s American films